Morley Torgov  (born 3 December 1927) is a Canadian novelist, humorist and lawyer. He was a partner in the Toronto-based legal firm Olch, Torgov, Cohen LLP.

Torgov was born in Sault Ste. Marie, Ontario. He studied law in Toronto at Osgoode Hall, formally becoming a lawyer in 1954. Laurentian University in Sudbury, Ontario awarded him an honorary Doctor of Letters degree in 1990. His 1982 novel was adapted into the 1988 film The Outside Chance of Maximilian Glick, of the same name. His short story collection A Good Place To Come From was made into a TV series.

Torgov is the father of actress and artist Sarah Torgov.

Honours
In 2015, he was named a member of the Order of Canada.

Awards and recognition

 1975: winner, Stephen Leacock Memorial Medal for Humour, A Good Place to Come From
 1977: finalist, Books in Canada First Novel Award, The Abramsky Variations
 1983: winner, Stephen Leacock Memorial Medal for Humour, The Outside Chance of Maximilian Glick

Bibliography
 1974: A Good Place to Come From (Lester and Orpen Dennys) 
 1977: The Abramsky Variations (Lester and Orpen Dennys) 
 1982: The Outside Chance of Maximilian Glick (Lester and Orpen Dennys) , paperback , Seal paperback 
 1990: St Farb's Day (Lester and Orpen Dennys) 
 1998: The War to End All Wars (Malcolm Lester) 
 2002: Stickler and Me (Raincoast) 
 2008: Murder in A-major (RendezVous Crime) 
 2012: The Mastersinger from Minsk (Dundurn)

References

External links
Morley Torgov profile, The Canadian Encyclopedia; accessed 10 May 2017. 

1927 births
Living people
Lawyers in Ontario
Canadian male novelists
Jewish Canadian writers
People from Sault Ste. Marie, Ontario
Stephen Leacock Award winners
Members of the Order of Canada